The Short Annals of Tirconaill is an Irish annal, or annual record, with entries dating from 1241 to 1650, but with numerous gaps, such as 1241 to 1423. Its authors are unknown; historian Paul Walsh speculated that it had several scribes over the course of some four hundred years, ending in 1650 or the years immediately after.

See also

 Annla Gearra as Proibhinse Ard Macha
 Short Annals of Leinster
 Irish annals
 Annals of the Four Masters

References

 Dublin, Trinity College MS H. i. 19, f. 140. for further details see T.K. Abbott and E.J. Gwynn (eds.), Catalogue of the Irish manuscripts in the library of Trinity College, Dublin (Dublin, 1921), 1293.
 Pól Breathnach, Short Annals Of Tirconaill, in Irish Book Lover 22 (Dublin 1934) 104-9.
 Rev. George Hill, An historical account of the Macdonnells of Antrim including notices of some other septs, Belfast 1873.
 Eugene O'Curry, Lectures on the manuscript materials of ancient Irish history (Dublin 1861; repr. Dublin, 1878 and 1995).
 Paul Walsh, The dating of Irish annals, in Irish Historical Studies 2 (1941), pp. 355–75.
 Gearóid Mac Niocaill, The medieval Irish annals (Dublin: DIAS, 1975).
 Daniel P. Mc Carthy, The Irish Annals: their genesis, evolution and history (Dublin 2008).

External links
 http://www.ucc.ie/celt/published/G100019/index.html

1650 books
Irish-language literature
Medieval literature
13th-century manuscripts
15th-century manuscripts
16th-century manuscripts
17th-century manuscripts
Early Irish literature
Irish texts
13th-century history books
14th-century history books
15th-century history books
16th-century history books
17th-century history books
Irish chronicles
Irish manuscripts
Works published anonymously